Interstate 980 (I-980) is a short  auxiliary Interstate Highway entirely within Oakland in Northern California, connecting I-580 and State Route 24 (SR 24) to I-880 near Downtown Oakland. I-980 passes the Oakland Convention Center and near the famous Jack London Square. I-980 is commonly considered the dividing line between Downtown Oakland and West Oakland. The freeway was planned as the eastern approach to the Southern Crossing. It is officially known as the John B. Williams Freeway, after the former director of the city of Oakland's Office of Community Development.

I-980 was used as an alternate route between Oakland and San Francisco when the Cypress Viaduct carrying I-880 collapsed in the 1989 Loma Prieta earthquake. Traffic headed from the south would have to use I-980 to I-580 west to I-80 west to get across the San Francisco–Oakland Bay Bridge to reach San Francisco. This ended when I-880 reopened on a new alignment in 1997 (1998 to and from I-80 east).

Route description
Although I-980 physically goes north and south, it is signed as an east–west route like SR 24. Immediately after traffic leaves I-880 on elevated connector ramps, I-980 then descends below grade to pass under downtown city streets. The freeway then ascends above grade to pass over SR 123 (San Pablo Avenue) and 27th Street before reaching I-580 and SR 24.

The freeway itself lacks overhead guide signs mentioning I-980. Immediately after exit 1B (SR 123/17th Street) going eastbound on I-980 is a guide sign mentioning the junction with I-580. Likewise, the guide signs on westbound I-980 at exit 1D (18th Street) list I-880 and San Jose as a control city. Since 2018, Jackson Street and I-880 south have been signed as exits 1B and 1A in the westbound direction.

I-980 is part of the California Freeway and Expressway System and is part of the National Highway System, a network of highways that are considered essential to the country's economy, defense, and mobility by the Federal Highway Administration (FHWA).

History
I-980 was added to the state highway system in 1947 as part of Legislative Route 226 (LRN 226) and to the California Freeway and Expressway System in 1959. This segment of LRN 226 became part of SR 24 in the 1964 state highway renumbering. The FHWA approved the addition of the roadway to the Interstate Highway System in January 1976, with Interstate funding only used west of SR 123, and the number was legislatively changed to I-980 in 1981.

Construction on I-980 began in the 1960s but was not completed until 1985; officially the freeway was designated as I-980 from its opening. The surface roads which existed prior to the completion of the freeway had been designated as SR 24. The highway was intended to serve the Southern Crossing and a regional shopping mall in Oakland, neither of which were ever built.

The San Francisco Chronicle reported in November 2015 about a grassroots organization of local architects and planners, supported by Oakland mayor Libby Schaaf, that propose to replace I-980 with a landscaped city boulevard. ConnectOakland is coordinating the push for a replacement. Arguments for replacement focus on the freeway's low volume of traffic and negative impact on surrounding neighborhoods. In January 2017, I-980 was included in Congress for the New Urbanism "Freeways without Futures" report.

Caltrans and the city of Oakland received a $680,000 Reconnecting Communities planning grant, funded by the 2021 Infrastructure Investment and Jobs Act, to study rebuilding or removing I-980. BART may use the corridor as an approach for a second Transbay Tube.

Exit list

See also

References

External links

California @ AARoads.com - Interstate 980
Caltrans: Route 980 highway conditions
California Highways: I-980
Interstate 980 connection from 1966 Southern Crossing plan
ConnectOakland

9
80-9
980
80-9
Interstate 80-9